Jayne Christie (née Measures) is an English international lawn bowler.

Christie made her international debut in 2000 and later captained England in 2008. She was runner-up in the 1999 & 2002 National Championships singles. In 2003 she was part of the England team that won Team gold medal at the  European Bowls Team Championships in Vilamoura.

In 2004, she won the gold medal in the fours with Jean Baker, Amy Monkhouse and Ellen Falkner at the 2004 World Outdoor Bowls Championship.

She went on to win National Mixed Fours title in 2013 with Nick Brett, Ellen Falkner and Chris Falkner.

She is also a member of the selection committee for Bowls England.

References

Living people
English female bowls players
Bowls World Champions
Year of birth missing (living people)